The 2016–17 Nemzeti Bajnokság I/A is the 80th season of the Nemzeti Bajnokság I/A, the highest tier professional basketball league in Hungary.

Teams 

The following 11 clubs compete in the NB I/A during the 2016–17 season. MTK-Budapest promoted as champions of the Division B, the second tier.

Personnel and kits

Managerial changes

Regular season

Results

Playoffs
Teams in bold won the playoff series. Numbers to the left of each team indicate the team's original playoff seeding. Numbers to the right indicate the score of each playoff game.

Quarter-finals
In the quarterfinals, teams playing against each other had to win two games to win the series. Thus, if one team wins two games before all three games have been played, the games that remain are omitted. The team that finished in the higher regular season place, played the first and the third (if it was necessary) games of the series at home.

Semi-finals
In the semifinals, teams playing against each other had to win two games to win the series. Thus, if one team wins two games before all three games have been played, the games that remain are omitted. The team that finished in the higher regular season place, played the first and the third (if it was necessary) games of the series at home.

Finals
In the finals, teams playing against each other had to win three games to win the title. Thus, if one team won three games before all five games were played, the remaining games were omitted. The team that finished in the higher regular season place, played the first, the third, and the fifth (if it was necessary) games of the series at home.

Game 1

Game 2

Game 3

Game 4

UNIQA Sopron won the FINAL series.

Third place
In the series for the third place, teams playing against each other had to win two games to win the 3rd place in the final rankings of the season. Thus, if one team won two games before all three games had been played, the remaining games were omitted. The team that finished in the higher regular season place, played the first and the third (if it was necessary) games of the series at home.

Playout

Results

Final standings

See also
 2017 Magyar Kupa

References

External links
 Hungarian Basketball Federaration 

Nemzeti Bajnokság I/A (women's basketball) seasons
Nemzeti Bajnoksag Women
Hungarian